Shah Avazi (also Romanized as Shāh ‘Avazī; also known as Shāh ‘Avaẕ) is a village in Takht Rural District, Takht District, Bandar Abbas County, Hormozgan Province, Iran. At the 2006 census, its population was 97, in 22 families.

References 

Populated places in Bandar Abbas County